We're Unstoppable is a compilation album by the Philadelphia hardcore band Blacklisted.  It is a compilation of their demo which was released in 2003, and their Our Youth Is Wasted EP which was released later on that year.

Track listing
"Long Way Home" – 0:56
"Finding Faith" – 1:57
"That Ain't Real Much" – 1:30
"Crossed Fingers" – 1:35
"3800 (We're Unstoppable)" – 2:40
"Transparent/Opaque" – 2:28
"My Advice" – 1:13
"Back And Forth" – 1:44
"Left Alone" – 2:01
"Who I Am" – 1:49

Blacklisted (band) albums
2005 albums
Deathwish Inc. compilation albums
Albums with cover art by Jacob Bannon